"It is a beauteous evening, calm and free" is a sonnet by William Wordsworth written at Calais in August 1802. It was first published in the collection Poems, in Two Volumes in 1807, appearing as the nineteenth poem in a section entitled 'Miscellaneous sonnets'.

The sonnet describes an evening walk on the beach with his nine-year-old daughter Caroline Vallon. Wordsworth reflects that if his young daughter is seemingly unaffected by the majesty of the scene it is because, being young, she is naturally at one with nature.

History 

Until that Friday 21 May 1802, Wordsworth had shunned the sonnet form, but his sister Dorothy's recital of Milton's sonnets had "fired him" and he went on to write some 415 in all.

"It is a beauteous evening" is the only "personal" sonnet he wrote at this time; others written in 1802 were political in nature and "Dedicated to Liberty" in the 1807 collection.

The simile "quiet as a nun / Breathless with adoration" is often cited as an example of how a poet achieves effects. On the one hand "breathless" reinforces the placid evening scene Wordsworth is describing; on the other hand it suggests tremulous excitement, preparing the reader for the ensuing image of the eternal motion of the sea. Cleanth Brooks provided an influential analysis of the sonnet in terms of these tensions in The Well Wrought Urn: Studies in the Structure of Poetry (see also Paradox (literature)).

The reference to Abraham's bosom (cf. ) has also attracted critical attention as that is normally associated with Heaven (or at least Purgatory) in the Christian tradition, inviting comparison with the Lucy poems. However, a natural reading is that Wordsworth was simply stressing the closeness of the Child to the divine: Stephen Gill references Wordsworth's ode: "Intimations of Immortality".

The 'natural piety' of children was a subject that preoccupied Wordsworth at the time and was developed by him in "Intimations", the first four stanzas of which he had completed earlier in the year but had put aside because he could not decide the origin of the presumed natural affinity with the divine in children, nor why we lose it when we emerge from childhood. By 1804 he believed he had found the answer in the Platonic doctrine of the pre-existence of souls and was able to complete his ode.  The fifth line in the sonnet, "The gentleness of heaven broods o'er the Sea", references the creation story of Genesis 1:2 (compare Milton's Paradise Lost 7:235, a poem Wordsworth knew virtually by heart), and a similar use of "broods" eventually appeared in "Intimations" in stanza VIII  The reference to the everlasting motion of the sea in the sonnet recalls the argument for immortality in Plato's dialogue Phaedrus (which also treats erotic love). Directly across the water, these images (and the direct imperative "Listen!") were to be later echoed by Matthew Arnold, an early admirer (with reservations) of "Intimations", in his poem "Dover Beach", but in a more subdued and melancholy vein, lamenting the loss of faith, and in what amounts to free verse rather than the tightly disciplined sonnet form that so attracted Wordsworth.

Caroline Wordsworth  

Caroline, born December 1792 (baptised 15 December), was Wordsworth's daughter by Annette Vallon (1766–1841), daughter of a surgeon at Blois, with whom Wordsworth had evidently entered into a relationship while visiting France during the Revolution in 1792. The subsequent war with England had put aside any hopes of marriage and it was only during the brief Peace of Amiens in 1802 that Wordsworth was able to visit and to see his daughter for the first time, though he and Annette had exchanged letters in the interim. By this time he was engaged to marry his childhood friend, Mary Hutchinson, a marriage made possible only by the settlement of a debt owed the Wordsworth family.

The affair was known to Dorothy and his immediate family and friends, including Coleridge and (eventually) Southey, but kept secret from the public and only published in 1916 as a result of George McLean Harper's researches. In the early 1920s, two early letters from Annette that had been impounded during the Napoleonic wars were discovered in the departmental archives of Loir-et-Cher. Other than a later 1834 letter, these are the only letters from Annette that survive (while letters from Wordsworth and Dorothy are lost). The earlier two letters reveal a spirited and charming young lady much in love with Wordsworth, well able to fend for herself. In hindsight it seems that the story of the doomed illicit love affair between Vaudracour and Julia that appears in The Prelude, also published as a separate longer poem in 1820, is an oblique autobiographical reference to Wordsworth's affair.

Neither is there any real record left to us of the Calais meeting. Dorothy provides an entry in her journals, but it was plainly entered later and there is no day by day account of the month-long visit, which must nevertheless have been a success given its length. Caroline herself is mentioned only fleetingly.

On the evidence of the sonnet, it is plain that Wordsworth felt genuine affection for his daughter, as indeed did Mary who was anxious that Wordsworth should do more for Caroline should their circumstances improve. Her wish was granted at Caroline's marriage in 1816, when Wordsworth settled £30 annually on Caroline, a generous allowance (£1,360 purchasing power in year 2000 pounds sterling) that continued until 1835, when it was replaced by a capital settlement of £400.

Wordsworth, together with Dorothy and Mary and their friend Crabb Robinson, saw Annette and Caroline just once more on a visit to Paris in 1820. By then Caroline had two young daughters. The younger of these left no children, but the elder, Louise Marie Dorothée Baudouin (third name after Dorothy), married the painter Théophile Vauchelet, bearing two daughters from whom the present day French descendants of Wordsworth stem. Caroline died in 1862. There is a portrait of Annette by Vauchelet in the museum at Versailles.

"The Evening star & the glory of the sky" 

Dorothy's journal entry gives scanty details of their Calais visit (though it does offer ample evidence of her remarkable descriptive power) and brings us back to abruptly to Dover following the second of just two references to Caroline:

"The Crescent-moon, the Star of Love" 

Dorothy's journal entry references the evening star sinking down in the west across the channel over Dover Castle, as does another of Wordsworth's Calais sonnets, "Fair Star of Evening, Splendour of the West". In fact on the day they arrived, Venus was in close conjunction with a three-day crescent moon, while Jupiter and Saturn, themselves in a relatively infrequent great conjunction (they occur roughly every 20 years) less than a fortnight before, were close by to the East. It must have been a beautiful sight and Dorothy, a knowledgeable observer of the night sky, must have been aware of it, possibly prevented from recording it earlier in her journal by the poor weather they had experienced journeying down from the North.

Some forty years later, six weeks as it happened after the death of Annette Vallon on 10 January the preceding month, Wordsworth composed these lines which were published in 1842:

Sources

Notes

Bibliography 
 Brooks, Cleanth. The Well Wrought Urn: Studies in the Structure of Poetry, Mariner Books 1956
 Davies, Hunter. William Wordsworth, Weidenfeld and Nicolson 1980
 Gill, Stephen. "William Wordsworth: The Major Works including The Prelude", Oxford University Press 1984
 Gill, Stephen. William Wordsworth: A Life, Oxford University Press 1989
 Harper, George McLean. William Wordsworth : his life, works, and influence Scribner 1916
 Legouis, Emile. William Wordsworth and Annette Vallon  J. M. Dent 1922
 Moorman, Mary. William Wordsworth, A Biography: The Early Years, 1770-1803 v. 1, Oxford University Press 1957
 Moorman, Mary. William Wordsworth: A Biography: The Later Years, 1803-50 v. 2, Oxford University Press 1965
 Page, Judith W. Wordsworth and the Cultivation of Women, University of California Press 1994
 E de Selincourt, Helen Darbishire. The Poetical Works of William Wordsworth, Oxford University Press 1947
 Wordsworth, Dorothy (ed. Pamela Woof). The Grasmere and Alfoxden Journals. Oxford University Press 2002

External links 

 Google Books archive of Poems in Two Volumes Volume I
 Google Books archive of Poems in Two Volumes Volume II
 Google Books archive of Cleanth Brooks' analysis of the sonnet
 Judith Page on Abraham's bosom
Vaudracour and Julia
Internet archive of the tale of Vaudracour and Julia as it appears in The Prelude
Internet archive of Volume 1 of Christopher Wordsworth's 1851 biography
Internet archive of Volume 2 of Christopher Wordsworth's 1851 biography
Internet archive of Emile Legouis' book on William Wordsworth and Annette Vallon
Internet archive of George McLean Harper's book on William Wordsworth

Poetry by William Wordsworth
1802 poems
1807 poems
Sonnets